

About village 
Khanpur Ghati is a village located in Nuh district in the state of Haryana, India. The Khanpur Ghati village has a population of 4225 of which 2188 are males while 2037 are females as per Population Census 2011.

In Khanpur Ghati village population of children with age 0-6 is 968 which makes up 22.91% of total population of village. Average Sex Ratio of Khanpur Ghati village is 931 which is higher than Haryana state average of 879. Child Sex Ratio for the Khanpur Ghati as per census is 1000, higher than Haryana average of 834.

It is about 100 km away from New Delhi, 72 km away from Gurugram, 30 km away from Dist. Headquarter Nuh, 1.7  km away from its Block Pinangwan and 23 km away from its Tehsil Firozpur Jhirka. Its coordinates are 27°54'23.93"N, 77°04'50.00"E. Khanpur Ghati is also a part of National Capital Region of Delhi (NCR), Situated at Major District Road 131 of Haryana. Some neighborhood villages in the surrounding area of Khanpur Ghati are Pinangwan, Dhadola, Dhadoli Kalan, Jhimrawat, Marora, Raniyala & Rithath etc.. The Post Office of the village is 'Khanpur Ghati' itself and Pin Code is 122508.

The newly under-construction Delhi-Mumbai Mega Expressway is being built near the village, it will be ready by year 2023. Much of the village's land is acquired to build this Highway.

Details of village 
Khanpur Ghati is located on a beautiful location under the Hill from Aravali Group. The village has a number of natural resources. Aravali Hills are located on the east side of the village and on the west side there is a canal named Banarasi Canal. Behind the Aravali Hills there is a small desert ( soil like deserts ), however there is access to water.
The village has its first VITA Industry - Milk Chilling Center Khanpur Ghati on the map of Mewat, 1st Girls Residential Mewat Model School which is managed by Mewat Development Agency (MDA, Govt. Of Haryana). Largest and well decorated water supply in Mewat, Yamuna Water Purification plant etc. are the current working projects in the village. The ISRO group of Indian scientists have positive sign of curd/liquid petroleum in the village and surroundings, consequently they are boring here.

The village has two parts - 1. Village (Main Residential Area)    2. Colony (The New Residential Area).
98% population of the village are MEO (Muslim). The Khanpurians belong to the "Chhiraklautra Gautra" (local caste system) and the role model for Chhiraklautra's is the late "Shaheed Dada Bahad" who fought against the King Akbar for the sake of Mewaties. The village is the second-largest educated village in Mewat. There are a number of well known personalities in the village those gave or giving their service at high level posts like Home Minister in Haryana Govt., Delhi Police, DMRC (Delhi Metro Rail Corporation), Haryana Police, Haryana Wakf Board, Banks, Doctors, Fishries Dept of Haryana, Teachers etc. in the Govt. Sector. There are a number of great Maulvis and Hafizes in the village. On the other hand, in the private sector there are a number of engineers like - Software Engg., Automation Engg, Electronics Engg., Mechanical Engg, Civil Engg and in medical line. There are some private sectors employees who work in foreign countries to support the village economy development with their hard earned money. There are many students studying in MBBS, CS,MBA, BDS, M.A, B.Tech, LLB, D-Pharma, B-Pharma etc. and some doctors are already working and providing their services. lots of students cleared neet cseet examinition sufiyan meo is one of the students who is first mewati who cleared CSEET Examinition

Administration 
In the year 2017, Sarpanch elections were commenced and around 89% people of the village cast their vote to select their Gram Sarpanch. The current Sarpanch of village Khanpur Ghati is Smt. Naseema w/o Saifuddin.

The main office of Panchayat is located near Meraj Public School, people often take their grievances to the office itself.
Panchayat also has online methods to connect with its people via social media. There are a number of ways people can connect to Panchayat village via Facebook, Twitter and YouTube, etc.

Education centers 
There are four schools for children's education in the village:
1. GOVT. PRIMARY SCHOOL
2. GOVT. SECONDARY SCHOOL
3. MEWAT MODEL SCHOOL
4. MERAJ PUBLIC SCHOOL

Monuments 
There are 7 mosques situated in the village. The biggest mosque is situated at the main junction and has the capacity to hold more than 700 persons. 
The oldest and beautiful Mosque is located on the top of the Aravali Hills and just up on Ghati of the Village. There are two old minars on the hill from ancient time.

Villages in Nuh district